Events in 2015 in Japanese television.

Events

Debuts

Ongoing
AKB48 Show!, variety (2013–present)
AKBingo!, variety (2008–present)
Music Fair, music (1964–present)
Sazae-san, anime (1969–present)
FNS Music Festival, music (1974–present)
Panel Quiz Attack 25, game show (1975–present)
Soreike! Anpanman, anime (1988–present)
Downtown no Gaki no Tsukai ya Arahende!!, game show (1989–present)
Crayon Shin-chan, anime (1992–present)
Nintama Rantarō, anime (1993–present)
Chibi Maruko-chan, anime (1995–present)
Detective Conan, anime (1996–present)
SASUKE, sports (1997–present)
Ojarumaru, anime (1998–present)
One Piece, anime (1999–present)
Doraemon, anime (2005–present)
Naruto: Shippuden, anime (2007–2017)
Tetsujin 28-go Gao!, anime (2013–2016)
Pocket Monsters XY, anime (2013–2016)
Fairy Tail, anime (2014–2016)
Yo-kai Watch, anime (2014–2018)
Yu-Gi-Oh! Arc-V, anime (2014–2017)
World Trigger, anime (2014–2016)
Cardfight!! Vanguard G GIRS Crisis, anime (2015–2016)

Returning Series
Majisuka Gakuen, drama (2010-2012; 2015–present) Moved to NTV
NogiBingo!, variety (2013–present)

Ended
JoJo's Bizarre Adventure: Stardust Crusaders, anime (2014-2015)
Dragon Ball Kai, anime (2014–2015)
Sailor Moon Crystal, ONA 1st Season (2014-2015)
Idoling!!!, variety show (2006-2015)
Cardfight!! Vanguard G, anime (2014–2015)
Utage!, musical (2013-2015)
Tamagotchi, anime (2009-2015)
Ultraman X, tokusatsu (2015)
Kamen Rider Drive, tokusatsu (2014-2015)
Ressha Sentai ToQger, tokusatsu (2014-2015)

Deaths

See also
 2015 in anime
 2015 Japanese television dramas
 2015 in Japan
 2015 in Japanese music
 List of Japanese films of 2015

References